The 2016 Fastlane was the second Fastlane professional wrestling pay-per-view and livestreaming event produced by WWE. It took place on February 21, 2016, at Quicken Loans Arena in Cleveland, Ohio. This was the last Fastlane event to be held before the reintroduction of the brand extension in July.

The event consisted of eight matches, including one on the Kickoff pre-show. In the main event, Roman Reigns defeated Brock Lesnar and Dean Ambrose in a triple threat match to become the #1 contender for the WWE World Heavyweight Championship to face Triple H at WrestleMania 32. In other prominent matches, AJ Styles defeated Chris Jericho by submission and Charlotte defeated Brie Bella by submission to retain the WWE Divas Championship.

Production

Background
In February 2015, WWE held a pay-per-view (PPV) and WWE Network event titled Fastlane. The name of the event was chosen as a reference to its position on the "Road to WrestleMania," being held in the two-month period between the Royal Rumble and WWE's flagship event. A second Fastlane event was scheduled for February 21, 2016, at Quicken Loans Arena in Cleveland, Ohio, thus establishing Fastlane as an annual pay-per-view for the promotion.

Storylines
The card consisted of eight matches, including one of the Kickoff pre-show, that resulted from scripted storylines, where wrestlers portrayed villains, heroes, or less distinguishable characters in scripted events that built tension and culminated in a wrestling match or series of matches, with results predetermined by WWE's writers. Storylines between the characters played out on WWE's primary television programs, Raw and SmackDown.

At the Royal Rumble, Triple H won the Royal Rumble match by eliminating WWE World Heavyweight Champion Roman Reigns and Dean Ambrose to win the WWE World Heavyweight Championship. On the following night on Raw, Stephanie McMahon scheduled a Triple Threat match featuring the rumble runner-up Ambrose, the previous champion Reigns and Brock Lesnar at the event, with the winner facing Triple H at WrestleMania 32 for the title.

At the Royal Rumble, Kalisto defeated Alberto Del Rio to win the WWE United States Championship. Del Rio then invoked his rematch clause to face Kalisto for the title at the event. The match was later moved to the Fastlane Kickoff pre-show, with Del Rio challenging Kalisto to a two-out-of-three falls match.

On the February 1 episode of Raw, Brie Bella defeated WWE Divas Champion Charlotte in a non-title match, earning a title match against Charlotte at the event.

On the same episode of Raw, Sasha Banks split from Team B.A.D., thus turning face, causing her former teammates Naomi and Tamina to attack Banks during her match against Becky Lynch. Lynch assisted Banks, setting up a tag team match between the two teams for the event.

Kevin Owens won his second Intercontinental Championship on the February 15 episode of Raw in a fatal five-way match also involving Tyler Breeze, Dolph Ziggler, Stardust and then-champion Dean Ambrose. Ziggler, who had defeated Owens in the previous two weeks on Raw, then challenged Owens to an Intercontinental Championship match at the event, with the match being confirmed for the event despite Owens refusing the challenge.

On the February 15 episode of Raw, an installment of The Cutting Edge Peep Show, hosted by Edge and Christian, was announced for the event, with The New Day as their special guests.

The Wyatt Family began feuding with Big Show, Kane and Ryback, with The Wyatt Family attacking the trio, after Bray Wyatt's victory over Kane on the January 25 episode of Raw, Big Show's victory over Erick Rowan on the February 1 episode of Raw and Wyatt's victory over Ryback a week later. On the February 15 episode of Raw, Big Show defeated Braun Strowman by disqualification after the Wyatt Family attacked Big Show. During the post-match, Ryback and Kane came out to assist Big Show, setting up a six-man tag team match for the event, with Big Show, Kane and Ryback facing Rowan, Strowman and fellow Wyatt Family member Luke Harper for the event.

AJ Styles made his WWE debut during the Royal Rumble match. On the following night on Raw, Styles defeated Chris Jericho. Jericho then defeated Styles in a rematch on the February 11 episode of SmackDown. On the following episode on Raw, Styles challenged Jericho to a third match at Fastlane, which Jericho accepted on the following episode of SmackDown.

Event

Pre-show
During the Fastlane Kickoff pre-show, Kalisto defended the United States Championship against Alberto Del Rio in a Two-out-of-three falls match. Kalisto won the first fall by disqualification after Del Rio attacked him with a chair. Del Rio won the second fall after a Double Foot Stomp on Kalisto, who was hanging on the middle rope. Kalisto pinned Del Rio with a roll-up to win the third fall and retain the title.

Preliminary matches
The actual pay-per-view opened with Becky Lynch and Sasha Banks facing Team B.A.D. (Naomi and Tamina). The match ended when Banks applied the Banks Statement on Tamina whilst Lynch applied the Dis-arm-her on Naomi, who both submitted simultaneously.

Next, Kevin Owens defended the Intercontinental Championship against Dolph Ziggler. Owens executed a Pop Up Powerbomb on Ziggler to retain the title.

After that, The Wyatt Family (Luke Harper, Erick Rowan, and Braun Strowman) faced Big Show, Kane, and Ryback. Ryback executed Shell Shocked on Harper to win the match for his team.

In the fourth match, Charlotte defended the Divas Championship against Brie Bella. Charlotte forced Brie to submit to the Figure Eight Leglock to retain the title.

In the fifth match, AJ Styles faced Chris Jericho. Jericho applied the Walls of Jericho Styles touched the ropes, forcing Jericho to break the hold. Jericho executed a Codebreaker on Styles but Styles's arm being under the bottom rope voided the pinfall. Styles executed a Styles Clash on Jericho for a near-fall. Styles forced Jericho to submit to the Calf Crusher to win the match.

Edge and Christian hosted the Cutting Edge Peep Show, with WWE Tag Team Champions The New Day, who first insulted Edge and Christian but then began to insult The League of Nations. When The League of Nations appeared, The New Day left the ring with Edge and Christian.

In an unannounced penultimate match, Curtis Axel faced R-Truth. Axel won the match by pinning R-Truth with a roll up.

Main event
In the main event, Roman Reigns, Dean Ambrose and Brock Lesnar (with Paul Heyman) fought to determine the #1 contender for the WWE World Heavyweight Championship at WrestleMania 32. To start the match, Lesnar executed two German Suplexes on Reigns, before Ambrose got involved. The action then spilled out of the ring, where Lesnar threw Reigns to the barricade. Ambrose then, tried a Suicide Dive on Lesnar, which ended in an Overhead Belly-to-Belly Suplex from Lesnar. Back in the ring, Lesnar executed two more German Suplexes and an F-5 on Reigns, but Ambrose voided the pinfall at a two count. Lesnar executed three German Suplexes on Ambrose and attempted an F-5, but Reigns executed a Spear on Lesnar for a near-fall. Reigns then, executed a Superman Punch on Lesnar, which caused him to roll out of the ring. Lesnar countered another Superman Punch and attempted a second F-5 on Reigns on an announce table, but Ambrose struck Lesnar with a low-blow, which was followed by a Double Powerbomb from Reigns and Ambrose on Lesnar through the same announce table. After fighting amongst themselves, Reigns and Ambrose stopped Lesnar from re-entering the match with another Double Powerbomb through another announce table. Reigns and Ambrose then, proceeded to bury Lesnar under the pieces from the two announce tables. Ambrose executed Dirty Deeds on Reigns for a near-fall. Lesnar then, jumped into the ring and executed a Double German Suplex on Reigns and Ambrose, while the last was on Reigns' shoulders. After Reigns executed another Spear on Lesnar, Lesnar executed a Kimura Lock on Reigns, but Ambrose attacked both men with a chair. When Lesnar rolled out of the ring by one more chair shot by Ambrose, Reigns executed a Spear on Ambrose to win the match by pinfall. After the match, Triple H came out and confronted Reigns in the ring.

Reception 
Like the previous year's event, Fastlane received generally mixed reviews from critics. Aaron Oster of The Baltimore Sun reviewed the pay-per-view as "solid", but noted that the show was "received so poorly" by fans that it led to "#CancelWWENetwork trending on Twitter once again". Regarding the main event, the fan "response has been instantly negative" despite a result "many expected". While the "match itself was good for the most part", the finish was questioned by Oster: "Why was Reigns able to jump right up after he got hit several times with a steel chair?" Styles-Jericho was "great" but Oster also questioned "why Chris Jericho was kicking out of the Styles Clash so early into Styles' WWE career." For the women's title match, "Brie looked OK" but was not on the level of Charlotte's previous opponents, Paige and Becky Lynch. Both the women's tag match and Owens-Ziggler were "good", with praise for Owens' "short-arm pop-up powerbomb". Meanwhile, Del Rio's disqualification was a "great piece of psychology that added to the match" for the U.S. title. Lastly, the Wyatt's loss was a "mistake" because "if they can't beat this thrown-together group, who can they beat?"

Jason "Marbles" Powell of ProWrestling.net "felt letdown by the overall show until the main event". This was in spite of "some good matches", because the entire Fastlane event failed to leave Powell "anxious to see WrestleMania", with "the Hunter vs. Reigns match just doesn't feel main event worth". For the matches, Powell was high on the main event ("very good" and without "a dull moment"), Jericho-Styles ("good drama down the stretch... Jericho did a really nice job of acting like he was in agony as he sold the Calf Crusher") and the Divas Championship bout ("an entertaining match with Brie using a lot of her husband’s moves"). Additionally, the Wyatts losing was "very surprising". For the negatives, Powell suffered network streaming issues for the women's tag match and the Intercontinental title match, Edge and Christian's segment "was terrible", and for Axel-Truth, Powell said, "I watched a pay-per-view and a Superstars match broke out".

James Caldwell of PWTorch.com reviewed the event, with three matches being rated 3.5 out of 5 stars: the main event, Jericho-Styles and Owens-Ziggler. The main event match was described as "WWE main event-style roller-coasting with ups-and-downs and twists and turns playing off the TV, but it was inevitable Reigns was winning, taking some of the steam out of the match". Caldwell criticized the "tone-deaf", "Super Cena booking" of Reigns as WWE failing to change the "presentation for a non-main-eventer masquerading in a main event role". Styles-Jericho had "few slip-ups on big spots", but a "very good, clear story" and "a very strong finish". Owens-Ziggler and Brie-Charlotte (2 stars) were both described as bouts where "the audience didn't really buy the babyface challenger having a shot to win". Del Rio-Kalisto was rated 3 stars and the women's tag match 2.5 stars. The six-man tag match was rated 2.25 stars, with Caldwell questioning if the Wyatts needed to resort to "another promo/sneak-attack trying to save face after another big loss". Caldwell was also negative on Edge and Christian's segment as "none of this made any sense from a character alignment perspective", as well as the Axel-Truth match for even happening, writing that "the PPV has gone off the rails, like a third hour of Raw".

Dave Scherer of PWInsider.com praised the main event match as "really, really good", but criticized the match result as Vince McMahon ignoring "the voice of the people... especially when the crowd made it really clear that of the two, they wanted Dean" over Roman Reigns. Scherer was most positive regarding the Styles-Jericho match, describing it as "freaking awesome. AJ did what AJ does and WWE let him do it... And kudos to Jericho for being a veteran stud here". For the women's matches, Scherer wrote that the title match "could have been the best match I have ever seen Brie have", while the tag bout was "good, solid". The Intercontinental title match was "great", as was Kevin Owens' performance in it. The United States title match was "solid", but Scherer criticized "how they are booking ADR" as "wasting him". Lastly, Scherer dismissed Edge and Christian's segment as an "in show ad".

Aftermath 
On the following night's episode of Raw, Brock Lesnar attacked Dean Ambrose in the Joe Louis Arena parking lot in Detroit for costing him the match at Fastlane. The attack sent Ambrose to a hospital. Later on Raw, Lesnar and Paul Heyman issued a challenge to anyone in the locker room to face Lesnar at WrestleMania. The still-injured Ambrose drove an ambulance back into the arena to challenge Lesnar in a No Holds Barred Street Fight at WrestleMania 32. Lesnar attacked Ambrose with an F-5 and accepted the challenge.

Ryback, Big Show, and Kane faced The Wyatt Family in a rematch on the following night on Raw. During the match, Ryback walked out of the match, allowing The Wyatt Family to take advantage and win the match when Bray Wyatt pinned Kane. Ryback later explained that he was sick of being in tag team matches.

On the following night's episode of Raw, Chris Jericho called out AJ Styles and told him he finally earned his respect. The Social Outcasts then interrupted them, leading to Jericho and Styles teaming up and defeating Heath Slater and Curtis Axel of The Social Outcasts. After defeating The New Day in two consecutive matches, Jericho and Styles faced The New Day in a title match on the March 7 episode of Raw, in which Jericho was pinned by Big E. After the match, Jericho attacked Styles with three Codebreakers, turning heel in the process.

After Sasha Banks defeated Naomi the following night on Raw, Sasha Banks and Becky Lynch faced each other on the February 29 episode of Raw to determine who would face Charlotte for the Divas Championship at WrestleMania 32. The match which ended in a draw after both women's shoulders were pinned. A rematch on the March 3 episode of Smackdown ended in a double disqualification after Charlotte attacked both women. After Charlotte insisted that no one deserves a title match, she was scheduled to defend her championship against both women in a Triple Threat Match at WrestleMania.

The 2016 Fastlane was the final Fastlane event to occur before the reintroduction of the brand extension in July, where WWE again divided its roster between the Raw and SmackDown brands where wrestlers were exclusively assigned to perform. The 2017 event was in turn made a Raw-exclusive show.

Results

References

External links 
 

2016
2016 WWE Network events
2016 in Ohio
Events in Cleveland
Professional wrestling in Cleveland
2016 WWE pay-per-view events
February 2016 events in the United States